Nettle refers to any of various plant species.

Nettle or nettles may also refer to:


Vessels
 , various ships with the name
 , two ships
 , a United States Coast Guard coastal freighter

Creeks
 Nettle Creek (Grass River), a stream in New York, United States
 Nettle Creek (Mad River), a stream in Ohio, United States
 Nettle Creek, Innot Hot Springs, Queensland Australia

People
 Nettles (surname), a list of people surnamed Nettles or Nettle

Other uses
 Nettle (cryptographic library), a cryptographic library developed by Niels Möller in 2001
 "Nettles", a song from the single Teddy Picker by the Arctic Monkeys
 Sea nettle, the jellyfish genus Chrysaora

See also

Nettie (disambiguation)